The Shire of Cranbrook is a local government area in the Great Southern region of Western Australia, about  north of Albany and about  south-southeast of the state capital, Perth.

History

The Cranbrook Road District was gazetted on 14 May 1926 out of parts of the Plantagenet and Tambellup road districts. On 1 July 1961, it became a Shire following changes to the Local Government Act, which reformed all remaining road boards into shires.

Wards
The shire is divided into 3 wards, each with 3 councillors:

 East Ward
 Central Ward
 West Ward

Towns and localities
The towns and localities of the Shire of Cranbrook with population and size figures based on the most recent Australian census:

( * indicates locality is only partially located within this shire)

Heritage-listed places

As of 2023, 35 places are heritage-listed in the Shire of Cranbrook, of which one is on the State Register of Heritage Places, the Tenterden Agricultural Hall, a building destroyed by bush fire on 27 December 2003.

References

External links
 

 
Cranbrook